The Catholic Church in Panama is part of the worldwide Catholic Church, under the spiritual leadership of the Panama Conference of Catholic Bishops and the Pope in Rome.

There are around 3.549 million Catholics in Panama, representing 55% of the populationReligion in Panama#cite note-2015survey-1</ref> and the country is divided into six dioceses, including one archdiocese. In addition, there is a Territorial Prelature and an Apostolic Vicariate.

The Diocese of Panama is thought to be the oldest in the Americas. It was set up in 1514, with the arrival of Franciscan missionaries. 

The Catholic Church in Panama has favoured status, though all religions are free.

References

External links
 gcatholic.org

 
Panama